Robert Strausz-Hupé (March 25, 1903 – February 24, 2002) was an Austrian-born American diplomat and geopolitical theorist.

Life and career 
Born in 1903 in Austria, Strausz-Hupé immigrated to the United States in 1923. Serving as an advisor on foreign investment to American financial institutions, he watched the Depression spread political misery across the America and Europe. 
After the Anschluss of Austria in 1938, Strausz-Hupé began writing and lecturing to American audiences on "the coming war." 
After one such lecture in Philadelphia, he was invited to give a talk at the University of Pennsylvania, an event which led to his taking a position on the faculty there in 1940.  He became an Associate Professor in 1946.

Strausz-Hupé founded the Foreign Policy Research Institute at the University of Pennsylvania in 1955, which later became independent in 1970. In 1957, the Institute published the first issue of Orbis, the quarterly journal that remains to this day the institute's flagship publication. Strausz-Hupé authored or co-authored several important books on international affairs.

Strausz-Hupé was a foreign policy advisor to Barry Goldwater when Goldwater was the Republican Party's candidate for President of the United States in 1964, and also advised Richard Nixon in his successful 1968 campaign. As president, Nixon appointed Strausz-Hupé to be Ambassador to Morocco in 1969, but the appointment was blocked by Arkansas Senator J. William Fulbright, head of the Foreign Relations Committee, on the grounds that Strausz-Hupé was too strongly against communism. Despite this, the following year he was appointed U.S. Ambassador to Sri Lanka and the Maldive Islands, and subsequently served as ambassador to Belgium (1972–74), Sweden (1974–76), NATO (1976–77), and Turkey (1981–89).

In 1989, upon retirement after eight years as Ambassador to Turkey, Strausz-Hupé rejoined the Foreign Policy Research Institute as Distinguished Diplomat-in-Residence and president emeritus.

Personal life and death
On April 26, 1938, in New York City, he married Eleanor DeGraff Cuyler Walker (1898-1976), daughter of railroad director Thomas DeWitt Cuyler (1854-1922) and his wife, Frances Lewis Cuyler (1860-1941). She was a descendant of the Hasbrouck family and a second cousin, once removed of New York Governor DeWitt Clinton. She was the youngest of four daughters, and was divorced from Joseph Walker with three children of her own: Eleanor Cuyler Walker Seyffert (1917-1992), Joseph Walker IV (1920-2007) and Peter Cuyler Walker (1925-2000). They did not have any children together, and Eleanor died on March 8, 1976, while in Sweden.

Strausz-Hupé married secondly Mayrose (nee Ferreira) Nugara (b. 1936) on August 22, 1979. She had three children of her own: Ingrid, Cynthia and Ricky. He died at home in Newtown Square, Pennsylvania, on February 24, 2002, at the age of 98.

Quotations
"As policy evolves towards several continental systems, and technology accentuates the strategic importance of large, contiguous areas. Thus the era of overseas empires and free world trade closes. If this reasoning is pushed to its absolute conclusion, the national state is also a thing of the past, and the future belongs to the giant state. Many nations will be locked in a few vast compartments. But in each of these one people, controlling a strategic area, will be master of the others." – Geopolitics: The Struggle for Space and Power (1942)

Works
 Axis America: Hitler Plans Our Future (1941)
 Geopolitics: The Struggle for Space and Power (1942)
 The Balance of Tomorrow:  Power and Foreign Policy in the United States (1945)
 International Relations (1950)
 The Zone of Indifference (1952)
 The Estrangement of Western Man (1953)
 A Forward Strategy for America (1955)
 Power and Community (1956)
 (co-editor) The Idea of Colonialism (1958)
 (with others) Protracted Conflict: A Forward Strategy for America (1959) 
 (with others) Building the Atlantic World (1963)
 In My Time: An Eclectic Autobiography (1965)
 Strategy and Values: Selected Writings of Robert Strausz-Hupé (1973)
 Democracy and American Foreign Policy: Reflections on the Legacy of Alexis de Tocqueville (1995)

References
Notes

Further reading
Kaplan, Robert D. (2012) The Revenge of Geography: What the Maps Tell Us About the Coming Conflicts and the Battle Against Fate'' New York: Random House.

External links
The Political Graveyard

1903 births
2002 deaths
Geopoliticians
American people of Austrian descent
Permanent Representatives of the United States to NATO
Ambassadors of the United States to Turkey
American political scientists
Ambassadors of the United States to Sri Lanka
Ambassadors of the United States to Belgium
Ambassadors of the United States to Sweden
Foreign Policy Research Institute
Pennsylvania Republicans
New Right (United States)
American anti-communists
20th-century American diplomats
20th-century political scientists